Al-Sahafa may refer to:
Al-Sahafa (United States)
Al-Sahafa (Sudan)